The 1937 French Grand Prix (formally the XXXI Grand Prix de l'Automobile Club de France) was a Grand Prix motor race which was held at Montlhéry, France on 4 July 1937. The race was held over 40 laps of the 12.5 km course for a total distance of 500 km. The race was won by Louis Chiron driving a Talbot. Similar to the 1936 race this year was run for sports cars. However, in order to help French manufacturers prepare for the new 1938 Grand Prix regulations, a 4.5L maximum engine capacity was imposed.

Classification

Fastest Lap: Louis Chiron, 5m29.7

References 

French Grand Prix
French Grand Prix
Grand Prix
1937 in French motorsport